Brigadier-General Renier (Cojack) Coetzee  is a General Officer in the South African Army.

Military career
Gen. Coetzee served in 32 Battalion and then in the South African Special Forces, for a long time as the Chief of Staff of the South African Special Forces Brigade. He commanded 5 Special Forces Regiment  (formerly 5 Reconnaissance Unit) at one stage, and served in the Mavinga area during Operations Moduler, Packer and Hooper. From mid-1987 to mid-1988, he was stationed at divisional headquarters, north-west of Mavinga in Angola.  He was promoted to Brigadier General in 2014.

Col. Coetzee was embroiled in a controversy about the use of body armour (bullet proof vests) by SANDF soldiers in the Central African Republic during the Battle of Bangui. He has spoken as an expert on the utilisation of the SANDF Special Forces as a force multiplier in the SADC region.

Awards and decorations

Medals 
Gen Coetzee has been awarded:

Proficiency and qualification badges 
Gen Coetzee qualified for the following:

References

|-

|-

|-

White South African people
South African Army generals
Year of birth missing (living people)
Living people